Jeff Longwell (born June 15, 1960) is an American politician and businessman who served as the 101st mayor of Wichita, Kansas from 2015 to 2020.

Prior to his election as mayor, Longwell served eight years on the Wichita city council and twelve years on the Maize school board.

Controversy
Longwell was accused of steering an over $500 million new drinking water facility project to his golfing friends in the Wichita Eagle on September 29, 2019, casting the deciding vote of the City Council. The headline had an email from the mayor to the contractors of PEC (Professional Engineering Consultants) saying, "I'm going to be super nice to you for a long time." Mayor Longwell was accused of changing the rules of the bidding process when his friends did not win.

Running for reelection in 2019, Longwell gathered 32.1% of ballots cast in a low-turnout election. Kansas state Representative Brandon Whipple received 26.3% in a nine-person field, advancing the two to a runoff to be held on November 5. In October 2019, an anonymous, salacious video attacking Whipple appeared online. The anonymously produced and circulated video made a claim of sexual harassment against Whipple that had in fact been copied, word-for-word, from an actual claim made against an anonymous Republican state senator in a Kansas City Star article two years earlier. Although elaborate covers had been implemented in Wyoming and New Mexico to conceal the identities of the perpetrators of the smear, an investigation by the Wichita Eagle revealed that the producer of the defamation was the campaign manager for a Longwell ally, Republican state Representative Michael Capps. It had been filmed at a downtown Wichita office building that Capps shared with another alleged Longwell ally, Wichita City Councilman James Clendenin. After Sedgwick County, Kansas Republican party chair Dalton Glasscock publicly called for Capps to resign, Capps then claimed, less than two days before the election, that Glasscock had actually approved the production of the ad, an allegation which Glasscock denied.

On election day, November 5, 2019, Longwell conceded the election to Whipple, who won 46% of the ballots versus 36% for Longwell, with the remainder cast for  write-in candidates which remained to be counted. The results were to be certified on November 15, 2019.

See also
 2015 Wichita mayoral election
 2019 Wichita mayoral election

References

21st-century American politicians
Kansas city council members
Kansas Republicans
Living people
Mayors of Wichita, Kansas
School board members in Kansas
Wichita State University alumni
Place of birth missing (living people)
1960 births